Dhulipalla Narendra Kumar is an Indian politician from Telugu Desam party and former member of Andhra Pradesh Legislative Assembly representing Ponnur constituency from 1994 - 2019. He is one of the few members of 
Andhra Pradesh Legislative Assembly who won five times continuously. He is also Chairman of Sangam Dairy located in Vadlamudi. He is one of the senior most leaders in the Telugu Desam Party and also coordinator for Eluru and Vijayawada parliament segments.

Education
Dhulipalla Narendra Kumar completed his SSC from Ananthavarappadu village and continued his Intermediate Education from Loyola College Vijayawada. He pursued his B.Tech in 1989 from University of Mysore

Career
Narendra Kumar is known for carrying development activities in Ponnur constituency after becoming Member of Legislative Assembly continued the legacy of his father.

First term (1994-1999)
He entered in to politics due to sudden demise of his father Dhulipalla Veeraiah Chowdary in 1994 in a road accident. He defeated his opponent T Venkata Ramaiah of Indian National Congress by a margin of 21,729 votes.

Second term (1999-2004)
Narendra Kumar won again on ticket of TDP by defeating his nearest rival Chittineni Prathap Babu of INC by margin of 15,000 votes. He also worked as the Telugu Desam Party Guntur district party president from 2002 to 2004.

Third term (2004-2009)
He continued to win again for third time though his Telugu Desam party was suffered badly in huge congress wave and was the only MLA elected from Guntur district in 2004 by a majority of 9,000 votes. He also worked as president for Telugu Raithu an affiliated farmers wing of Telugu Desam Party.

Fourth term (2009-2014)
Narendra Kumar won again on TDP ticket for fourth consecutive term with a meagre difference of 2000 votes. He was elevated to position of opposition party Whip in Andhra Pradesh Legislative Assembly.
He also became the chairman of Sangam Dairy in 2010.

Fifth term (2014-2019)
He continued his winning storm even in 2014 and became few of the MLA's who won consecutively five times in Andhra Pradesh Legislative Assembly. He focused mainly on expansion of Sangam Dairy.

In 2019 he was lost to his opponent by minor difference of 1100 votes.

Election statistics

References

1967 births
Living people
Telugu Desam Party politicians
University of Mysore alumni
Andhra Pradesh MLAs 1994–1999
Andhra Pradesh MLAs 1999–2004
Andhra Pradesh MLAs 2004–2009
Andhra Pradesh MLAs 2009–2014
Andhra Pradesh MLAs 2014–2019